Pauliina Suoniemi (born 24 March 1991) is a Finnish ice hockey player and captain of Vaasan Sport Naiset of the Naisten Liiga (NSML). She is Vaasan Sport's all-time career leader in assists and ranks fifth in points.

References

External links
 

1991 births
Living people
Sportspeople from Tampere
Finnish women's ice hockey forwards
Vaasan Sport Naiset players